The 2021 Artsakh Football League is the 3rd official professional season of the Artsakh Football League. It started on the March 7th, 2021 and is composed of nine clubs which will compete for the title.

Participants  

Nine teams will take part in this year's competition. Initially it was decided that 10 teams would participate, which included Russian peacekeeper's team. However, the Russian team later withdrew.

Clubs

League table

Results
The league will be played in three stages, for a total of 24 matches played per team.

References

Art
Artsakh Football League, 2021